Komsomolske is a name of several localities in Ukraine:

 Komsomolske, Donetsk Oblast, a city in Donetsk Oblast
 Former name of Slobozhanske, an urban-type settlement in Kharkiv Oblast
 Former name of Makhnivka, Koziatyn Raion, a village in Vinnytsia Oblast